Bommarillu is the soundtrack album composed by Devi Sri Prasad for the 2006 Tollywood film of the same name directed and co-written by Bhaskar in his directorial debut, and produced by Dil Raju under the banner Sri Venkateswara Creations. The album consists of seven tracks with Sirivennela Seetharama Sastry, Chandrabose, Andrea Jeremiah, Bhaskarabhatla Ravi Kumar, Kulasekhar and Ananta Sriram penning the lyrics. The soundtrack album released on 21 June 2006 under Aditya Music label. The film stars Siddharth, Genelia, Prakash Raj and Jayasudha. The film primarily revolves around the relationship between a father and son, in which the father's excessive concern for his son, and interference in his life, leads to the latter harbouring bitterness towards his overbearing father.

Production

Development 
For the film's music and soundtrack, Raju renewed his previous association (Arya and Bhadra) with Devi Sri Prasad. Savitha Reddy rendered the voice for Genelia's character in the film. A feature of this film is Siddharth singing one of the tracks from the film.

Filming 
A couple of the songs were shot in a montage, another couple in Frankfurt am Main and other places in Germany and one song each in this house set and at a temple in Kakinada.

Release 
The soundtrack album was released on 21 June 2006 during a pre-release event. The album was made available for commercial use from 23 June 2006. The music rights were owned by Aditya Music label.

Track listing

Score

Reception 
The album became a chartbuster of the year among the Telugu music albums. It became one of the most sold Telugu music albums of the year. The background score got huge praise.

Critical reception 
"Siddharth is one lucky actor that whatever fate his films might have faced, the songs in them have been top rate. So, with high expectations that one reaches for Bommarillu's audio. And it is also from Devi Sri Prasad, back in form and fettle. Siddharth packs lot of energy in his acting. He does so in his singing. The fun song "Appudo Ippudo" with all the right elements to back it, has Siddharth delivering it in high-pitched warble. His voice has an attractive mix of youthfulness and innocence. Full of zingy beats and lively instrumentation. You will enjoy it despite the absolute predictability. The violin rendition of the film's theme in between is very beautiful. A good one in the album. On the whole, Bommarillu reflects what life is --- fun, mediocrity and inspired moments." wrote IndiaGlitz in its music review of the album.

Idlebrain.com stated that "Music of the film is very good and background music is excellent. The scenes in the first half are so good that songs come as speed breakers to the narration. The songs in second half are excellently blended into the narration with good emotional quotient. The choreography for ‘Bommani Geeste’ song (4th in the film) is exemplary. The pathos song that comes in parts in second half is brilliant."

Awards and nominations

References 

2006 soundtrack albums
Devi Sri Prasad soundtracks
Romance film soundtracks
Telugu film soundtracks
Drama film soundtracks
Comedy film soundtracks
Aditya Music soundtracks